New York Pancyprian-Freedoms is an American amateur soccer team based in Astoria, New York, United States. Founded in 1974, the team plays in the Eastern Premier Soccer League, a league at the fifth tier of the American Soccer Pyramid.

The team plays its home games at Belson Stadium on the campus of at St. John's University. The team's colors are white and blue.

History

The Pancyprian-Freedoms were founded in 1974, and have competed in New York City’s Cosmopolitan Soccer League, a well-respected league which dates back to the 1920s and which is a member of the United States Adult Soccer Association Region I group of leagues, since that inaugural season. The Freedoms have won eight Cosmopolitan League titles in their history, in 1979, 1980, 1982, 2003, 2004, 2008, 2010, 2011, and 2019.

The Pancyprian-Freedoms are also one of the all-time great National Challenge Cup clubs, and have qualified, or have attempted to qualify, for the Open Cup every year of their existence. They won the cup three times in the pre-Major League Soccer era, in 1980, 1982 and 1983, and following their triumph in 1983 they reached the semi-finals of the CONCACAF Champions' Cup in 1984, beating Mexican powerhouse Puebla on penalties, and overcoming Honduran champions Vida, before they and their semi-final opponents CD Guadalajara were disqualified after failing to agree on the dates of the matches.

The Pancyprian-Freedoms have qualified for the final stages of the Lamar Hunt US Open Cups in the MLS era on several occasions. They lost 3–2 in extra time to the Real Maryland Monarchs in the first round in 2008, and lost 2–0 in the first round to USL Premier Development League team Long Island Rough Riders in 2010. In 2011 for the Lamar Hunt Cup they lost to FC New York (NPSL) 4–3 in PK's after extra time of a 0–0 regulation time tie after defeating the Brooklyn Italians (NPSL) 2–0 in the first round. In 2016 they advanced to the 2nd Round after beating the Red Bulls U23 (PDL) 2-1 at Belson Stadium (Round 1). In Round 2 they lost to Jersey Express (PDL) 1-0.

In addition to their CSL and USOC exploits, the Pancyprian-Freedoms won the 2008 USASA Open Cup, beating the Arizona Sahuaros 2–1 after extra time in the final in Seattle, Washington. They also won the 2010 USASA Open Cup in Philadelphia, PA beating the Brooklyn Italians (NPSL) 3–1 in the final after besting Detroit FC (MI) 3–0 in the semifinals and the 2011 USASA Open Cup besting AAC Eagles (ILL) 6–0 in the semifinals and Doxa Italia (CA) in the final 5–4 in pk's following 2–2 tie after regulation and 2OT's in Bowling Green, KY.

The current men's team is composed primarily of players that came up through the Eleftheria-Pancyprian Youth teams, the youth soccer division of the Pancyprian Association of New York. The majority of players have played NCAA Division I college soccer, and are now young business professionals or attending graduate school in various fields of study.

New York Freedom
After years of competing in the Cosmopolitan League and the US Open Cup, the Freedoms branched out and created a second team – called the New York Freedom – which joined the USL Premier Development League in 1999. The Freedom won the Northeast Division title and advancing to the PDL national semifinals in their inaugural season, and qualified for the US Open Cup, where they upset the Cape Cod Crusaders of the USL D3 Pro League in the first round and nearly eliminated the A-League’s Rochester Raging Rhinos, eventually falling 2–1 in extra time to the eventual champions. The Freedoms left the USL in 2003.

Players

2015–2016 roster

Year-by-year

Head coaches
  Marios Laoutas (1978–1981)
  Mimis Papaioannou (1982–1984)
  Nikos Exarhidis (1986–1988)
  Lambros Lambrou (1989–1994)
  Luka Luković (2005–2011)
 George Halkidis (2011–2012)
 Stratis Mastrokyriakos (2012–present)

Honors
Cosmopolitan Soccer League (9): 1979, 1980, 1982, 2003, 2004, 2008, 2010, 2011, 2019
National Challenge Cup (3): 1980, 1982, 1983
Participations in CONCACAF Champions' Cup: 1982, 1983, 1984

Stadium
 Belson Stadium at St. John's University; Jamaica, New York (2005–present)

References

External links
Official website

Pan
Soccer clubs in the New York metropolitan area
Cosmopolitan Soccer League
1974 establishments in New York City
Greek-American culture in New York City
Sports in Queens, New York
Association football clubs established in 1974
Diaspora soccer clubs in the United States
U.S. clubs in CONCACAF Champions' Cup
U.S. Open Cup winners